According to the Book of Mormon, Abinadom was a Nephite record keeper and the son of Chemish.  He received the Plates of Nephi from his father and penned two verses in the Book of Omni before conferring the record to his son, Amaleki.
Verses attributed to Abinadom in the Book of Mormon:
10 Behold, I, Abinadom, am the son of Chemish. Behold, it came to pass that I saw much war and contention between my people, the Nephites, and the Lamanites; and I, with my own sword, have taken the lives of many of the Lamanites in the defence of my brethren.
11 And behold, the record of this people is engraven upon plates which is had by the kings, according to the generations; and I know of no revelation save that which has been written, neither prophecy; wherefore, that which is sufficient is written. And I make an end.

Possible origin of the name 
Hugh Nibley relates the name to Canaanite and Egyptian origins and states:

"This is a Canaanite name. I'll bet 'Abinadom' means 'Abinetchem'. It's a combination, a typical Canaanite name. It means 'Abi (my father) is friendly, gentle, loving'. 'Netem' means 'sweet or agreeable' in Egyptian and it's a borrowed word. So Abinetchem could very well mean 'my father is benevolent or sweet'."

The name Abinadom is also similar to other Book of Mormon names such as Abinadi and the final syllable is similar to the Old Testament name Adam (Hebrew "אָדָם") meaning "man".

References

Book of Mormon people